Queensland Sapphires are an Australian netball team that represents Netball Queensland in the Australian Netball Championships. Between 2008 and 2019, as Queensland Fusion, they played in the Australian Netball League. Sapphires are effectively the reserve team of Queensland Firebirds and the representative team of the HART Sapphire Series.

History

Queensland Fusion
Between 2008 and 2019, Queensland Fusion played in the Australian Netball League. They were founder members of the ANL. Their best performance in the ANL came in 2014 when they reached the grand final but lost 51–49 to Victorian Fury.

Regular season statistics

Queensland Sapphires
In 2021, Queensland Fusion were re-branded Queensland Sapphires after the HART Sapphire Series. In September 2021, they were due to represent Netball Queensland in the inaugural Australian Netball Championships tournament. However, this tournament was cancelled due to the COVID-19 pandemic. Sapphires subsequently played in a four team series, playing against Sunshine Coast Lightning's ANC team, the Queensland Suns men's netball team and PacificAus Sports, a Pacific Islander select.

Grand finals

Home venue
During the 2019 ANL season, Queensland Fusion played their home matches at the
Queensland State Netball Centre.

Notable players

2021 squad

Internationals

 Demelza Fellowes
 Cara Koenen
 Laura Scherian 
 Gretel Tippett
 Stephanie Wood

 Verity Simmons

 Simone Nalatu 

 Ameliaranne Wells

 Maleta Roberts

 Lenora Misa

Queensland Firebirds

Sunshine Coast Lightning
 Cara Koenen
 Madeline McAuliffe
 Jacqui Russell
 Laura Scherian 
 Stephanie Wood

Head coaches

Premierships
Australian Netball League
Runners up: 2014: 1

References

 
Sapphires
Australian Netball Championship teams
Netball teams in Queensland
Netball
Sports clubs established in 2008
2008 establishments in Australia
Netball teams in Australia
Sporting clubs in Brisbane